Renchen is a small town in Baden-Württemberg, Germany, part of the district of Ortenau.

Geography
Renchen is located in the foothills of the northern Black Forest at the entrance to the Rench valley at the edge of the Upper Rhine River Plains.

Neighboring communities
The city shares borders with the following cities and towns, listed clock-wise from the north:  Achern, Kappelrodeck, Oberkirch, Appenweier, and Rheinau.

Boroughs
In addition to Renchen (proper) the city includes the boroughs of Erlach and Ulm zu Renchen.

History
Renchen was first in official documents in 1115. In 1326 it received a town charter but the town lost it again as well as all significance when it was destroyed during the Thirty Years' War. In 1838 the Grand Duke of Baden again granted a town charter to Renchen but it again lost the right to call itself a town as a result of the German district reform in 1935. Renchen then received a town charter for the third time in 1950 in recognition of its historic importance.

Renchen's borough of Ulm zu Renchen is known mostly for its Ulmer Bier, a specialty beer brewed only at full moon.

Government

Town council
As of February 2006, Renchen's city council has the following composition:

Elections in May 2014:
FWV: 8 seats
CDU: 6 seats
SPD: 4 seats

Mayors
 1945: Albert Dietrich
 -1969: Franz Brandstetter 
 1969-1985: Erich Huber
 1985–2000: Klaus Brodbeck
 since 2000: Bernd Siefermann

People, culture & architecture

Grimmelshausen Prize
The Grimmelshausen Prize is a literary prize of €10,000 awarded in odd-number years on September 15, in turn, by Renchen or the city of Gelnhausen.

Economy and infrastructure

Media
In Renchen the Offenburger Tageblatt publishes a daily local edition as "Acher-Rench-Zeitung" and the Stattzeitung für Südbaden is an alternative magazine offered in the area.

Sons and daughters of the town

 Amand Goegg (1820-1897), Baden freedom fighter, honorary citizen of the city Geneva, married the women's rightswoman Marie Goegg-Pouchoulin
 Martin Knosp (born 1959), wrestler, World Champion 1981, 
 Norbert Dobeleit (born 1964), athlete, medalists at the Seoul Summer Olympic Games 1988

Famous people
Renchen likes to call itself the city of Grimmelshausen, as the poet Hans Jakob Christoffel von Grimmelshausen, author of Der Abenteuerliche Simplicissimus Teutsch, served from 1667 until his death in 1676 as the Bishop of Strasbourg's executor in Renchen.

References

External links
 
 Stattzeitung für Südbaden, erscheint in Renchen

Towns in Baden-Württemberg
Ortenaukreis
Baden